The 2005 Arkansas State Indians football team represented Arkansas State University as a member of the Sun Belt Conference the 2005 NCAA Division I-A football season. Led by fourth-year head coach Steve Roberts, the Indians finished the season with an overall record of 6–6 and a mark of 5–2 in conference play, sharing the Sun Belt title with Louisiana–Lafayette and Louisiana–Monroe. Arkansas State was invited to the New Orleans Bowl, where they lost to Southern Miss.

A 31-month-long investigation by the NCAA discovered that 31 ineligible athletes in various sports were fielded in several different sports programs at Arkansas State. As a result, in 2011, four of the football team's wins from the 2005 season all six victories from the 2006 season were vacated as self-imposed penalties by Arkansas State.

Schedule

References

Arkansas State
Arkansas State Red Wolves football seasons
Arkansas State Indians football